The Scout Association of Guyana, is a Scouting organization in Guyana formed in 1967 as a successor to The Scout Association of the United Kingdom's Guiana branch. The association became a member of the World Organization of the Scout Movement in 1967. In 2008, the association had 424 members.

History
There is a record of Scout Troops in British Guiana in 1909. Later, some Scout Troops registered with The Boy Scouts Association of the United Kingdom which established a branch in British Guiana. The Boy Scouts Association appointed a District Commissioner, District Committee, and its executive committee. In 1920 these became the Colony Commissioner, Colony Boy Scout Council and its executive committee. The Boy Scouts Association's British Guiana branch changed its name to The Scout Association of Guyana, which joined the World Organization of the Scout Movement in 1967.

Early troops
Scouting was introduced to British Guiana in 1909, making Guyana the first Caribbean country to start scouting and fifth in the world. The first Scout Troop was formed at Queen's College under the leadership of George Manly, a Sergeant Major in the British Regiment stationed there. New troops formed, being attached chiefly to church schools including St. Mary’s, St. Theresa’s, St. Stanislaus, St. Francis, St. Thomas More, HQ Troop 39, St. Pius ,and Central High in Georgetown.

Troop 39 was a notable group, as the first Troop to make the overland journey to Kaieteur Falls. This Troop produced some of Guyana's scout leaders - including two Chief Commissioners, D.B. St. Aubyn and Lawrence Thompson, and 4 Assistant Chief Commissioners for Cubs.

Scouting spread from the county of Demerara to the county of Berbice, where a renowned Troop, Lady Davson's Own, was formed.

Scouting emerged in the county of Essequibo in the 1940s with Troops mostly attached to Church Schools. A troop was started at Onderneeming Boys' Reformatory in Suddie. Sam Cummings, an instructor at the School, was the first Scout Leader, followed by the Headmaster, a Mr Kissoon. There were a few Troops and Packs in the Pomeroon and Rupununi districts. For many of these Troops the departure of the resident Priest meant the closure of the Troop. A Troop at Kamarang, Upper Mazaruni, catering mainly for Amerindian boys, was run by Canon John Dorman, who had been trained as a scout leader at Gilwell, England.

Another prominent Troop was St Stanislaus College Troop, catering for Roman Catholic boys before the school became co-educational. Among its leaders was Father Bernard Darke, S.J., who had been trained as a Scout Leader at Gilwell, England and made a great contribution to Scouting in Guyana before his death. As well as running the Troop he served on Guyana's Scout Executive Committee and was a member of the Leader Training Team.

Further history
The first Jamboree Camp in British Guiana was held in 1912.

In the 1960s, scouts included Land, Sea,and Air Scouts and Rovers. Sea and Air Scouts no longer exist. Scouts were probably at its peak around 1969 when their Diamond Jubilee was celebrated and the 3rd Caribbean Jamboree was held there in August. In 1974 the government formed the Guyana National Service, a compulsory youth organization. This affected the organization's numbers. Some leaders joined the National Service where they were paid. While there was no ban on Scouting during this period, the organization was obliged to keep a low profile. With changes in the political situation came renewed support for Scouting in the 1980s.

The 2019 National Camp of the Scouts Association of Guyana marked the 110th anniversary of scouting in Guyana. The headquarters is located at Woolford Avenue

Training
To obtain the highest rank, a Scout must pass the normal proficiency tests, and, in addition, must be able to obtain badges in agriculture, which prepares each Scout to feed himself from his own produce.

Leader training

Many of the Anglican and Roman Catholic priests who came from England to serve in Guyana had received Scout Leader Wood Badge training at The Boy Scouts Association's Gilwell Park in England. These included the late Archbishop of the West Indies, Dr Alan John Knight, who served on the Colony Scout Council for many years and welcomed the Cub Pack from St Gabriel's School, Convent of the Good Shepherd, who held their meetings on the lawn of his residence, Austin House, for many years. A lack of official trainers in Guyana had Scouters train at Paxdale, Trinidad for many years. Brian Fox, seconded from England in the 1950s spent about three years training leaders and expanding Scouting. It was in this time that British Guiana's Scout Training Team was formed.

Presidents
Justice E. Hewick (1910)
Hon Geo. Garnett, CMG (1911)
Sir Alfred P Sherlock (1913)
Colonel WE Clarke (1918)
Colonel Cecil May (1919)
Colonel FH Blackwood, DSO (1925)
Hon Hector Josephs, KC (1926)
Admiral FC Fisher (1929)
Rev Canon JT Robert, REA (1930)
Prof J Sydney Dash (1937)
LG Crease (1942)
Capt H Nobbs, OBE (1950)

Commissioners
Early Commissioners were referred to as District Commissioners. In 1920 their title was changed to Colony Commissioner. Commissioners have included:

Capt LD Cleare (1913)
HW Sconce (1919)
Major William Bain-Gray (Director of Education) (1925)
Rev C Norman (1926)
Hon C Douglas-Jones, CMG (Colonial Secretary) (1929)
Capt R Patrick (Director of Education Acting) (1929)
Capt F Burnett (1930)
JD Gillespie (1931)
Fred T Weston (1941)
John R Durey, MBE (Awarded Silver Acorn) (1942)
DB St Aubyn, MBE (1952)

Wolf Cubs and Cubs
Cubbing in Guyana started in 1926 with the first Wolf Cub pack being St Barnabas Anglican Church, under the leadership of Mr Braithwaite. The first ACC Cubs was Mrs Isadora Walton, Cubmaster of Pack 39, who did a great deal to spread this section of the organization.

The first Guyanese Cubmaster to be trained at Gilwell was Evelyn St Aubyn who succeeded Isadora Walton as ACC Cubs around 1938. George Manly's granddaughter, Daphne Manly, ran Pack 39 for many years.

40th Anniversary of Cubbing
A special program of activities was planned for the 40th Anniversary of Cubbing in Guyana. On 17 April 1966 over 200 Cubs spent the day at Camp Jubilee observing Cub Day. Clement Gomes and the Camp Jubilee staff assisted Pack Scouters. Communion services were held on arrival in both Anglican and Roman Catholic chapels, and were well attended.

On 20 August Packs held a campfire at Scout Headquarters to raise funds for the Blind Association. Michael Pereira arranged the program. The campfire was well attended and raised $108.50.

On 2 October a party of Old Wolves spent the day at Camp Jubilee. Three yellow cassia trees were planted by CC Lewis, E. Reece and Elsie Taylor in commemoration of the 40th Anniversary. On 30 October Thanksgiving services were held at Main Street Catholic Church and Christ Church (Anglican).

On 26 November the Annual Play Acting Competition was held at Scout Headquarters. The Cup, presented by its donor, Mr. LB Thompson, was won by St Francis Pack. On 9 December Old Wolves entertained Mr. George Mitchell in the Cub Den. Mr. Mitchell expressed his pleasure at seeing the Den, whose sod he had turned on his previous visit in 1963.

Census
1987: 341 Scouts, 125 Cubs and 49 Leaders
2001: 399 members
2008: 424 members

See also
 Guyana Girl Guides Association

References

World Organization of the Scout Movement member organizations
Youth organizations established in 1909
Scouting and Guiding in Guyana